The Whip Hand is a 1951 American film directed by William Cameron Menzies and starring Carla Balenda and Elliott Reid.

Plot
Journalist Matt Corbin (Elliott Reid) is traveling through Wisconsin on a fishing trip and comes across a nearly deserted town where the few inhabitants left are secretive and hostile. A shifty lodge owner named Steve Loomis (Raymond Burr) warns Matt away, claiming all the fish died off mysteriously years ago. The story just makes Matt more curious, and his investigations soon uncover a Kremlin plot to poison the American water supply. Now he just needs to get back to the city alive.

Cast
Carla Balenda as Janet Keller
Elliott Reid as Matt Corbin
Edgar Barrier as Dr. Edward Keller
Raymond Burr as Steve Loomis
Otto Waldis as Dr. Wilhelm Bucholtz
Michael Steele as Chick
Lurene Tuttle as Molly Loomis
Peter Brocco as Nate Garr
Lewis Martin as Peterson
Frank Darien as Luther Adams
Olive Carey as Mabel Turner

Production
In July 1949, RKO purchased the screen story written by Roy Hamilton. The film was originally set in New England, and was titled The Man He Found; the term "the whip hand" comes from horse racing, and is a metaphor for having the advantage or upper hand. In the original story the villains were escaped German Nazis involved in a plot to hide Adolf Hitler, portrayed by Bobby Watson. When Howard Hughes viewed the completed film in November 1950, he announced that Nazis were no longer villains, Communists were, and ordered portions of the film reshot.  Wheeler W. Dixon writes that "The Whip Hand compels the viewer's attention through the sheer visual frenzy of its violent, aggressive camera work, coupled with its nightmarish, forced-perspective sets, which seems to overpower both the view and the film's protagonists."

Location shooting took place in Big Bear Lake as well as at RKO's ranch in Encino.

Reception
The film lost an estimated $225,000.

References

External links

1951 films
1950s crime thriller films
American anti-communist propaganda films
Films set in Wisconsin
American black-and-white films
American crime thriller films
Cold War films
Films directed by William Cameron Menzies
Films shot in Big Bear Lake, California
Films shot in Los Angeles
RKO Pictures films
Films scored by Paul Sawtell
1950s English-language films
1950s American films